Nílson Santos Varela Miguel (born 10 May 1992) is a Portuguese professional futsal player who plays as a defender for Benfica and the Portugal national team.

References

External links

1992 births
Living people
Portuguese men's futsal players
Sportspeople from Lisbon
S.L. Benfica futsal players